Ad Inferna is a French gothic/black metal and darkwave/gothic-industrial band consisting of members VoA VoXyD and Vicomte Vampyr Arkames (ex Seth), formed in 1998.

History
Their debut album L'Empire des Sens was released in 2001 (recorded at Excess Studio in 1999, the Netherlands, mastered at Kohlekeller Studio, Germany) under the German label Last Episode first, then under Silverdust GmbH, a division of the German label Metal Blade. The band was programmed at the Summer Breeze Festival in Germany in 2002, sharing stage with Dimmu Borgir, Nightwish, Tiamat and The Gathering.  
In 2001, the band was confirmed on a European tour with the Norwegian bands Ancient and Windir. The band split up in 2003 after several financial problems with their first label Last Episode.

In 2009, after 7 years without performing, the band reformed leaving aside their symphonic black metal style for an industrial metal sound. This resulted in the album Trance n' Dance, recorded, mixed and mastered by Neb Xort (Anorexia Nervosa) at the Drudhenhaus Studio in France. The band signed with Aural Music / Dreamcell11 and got distributed by Soolfood. The album features 12 tracks including collaborations with bands such as Reaper, Soman, Combichrist and Beborn Beton.

In 2010, Ad Inferna signed a three-album contract with the American label Nilaihah Records. The album DSM was released, co-produced and mastered by Vasi Vallis (Frozen Plasma, Reaper, NamNamBulu).

In 2011, Ad Inferna released the album There Is No Cure, an album which occasionally returned to their black metal roots. The album features Kari Berg (formerly of Ashbury Heights) and Zombie Girl.

In 2012, the band decided to create their own label DSM Music, in association with Audioglobe managing the distribution. Ultimum Omnium was released on this label the same year.

In 2013, the band released their album Im Mortelle featuring female vocals from Melissa Ferlaak (ex Visions of Atlantis, ex Aesma Daeva), Alina Dunaevskaya (Markize), Annie Bertram and MyLucina. The album was deemed "Album of the week" by Orkus magazine in March 2013.

The band signed a deal with the growing label Advoxya Records in Hungary and release Opus 7: Elevation.

Ad Inferna disbanded in April 2015. VVA decided to stop his musical career while VoA VoXyD decided to create the band Sollertia (Apathia Records) together with James Fogarty (In the Woods...).

In 2019, the band released a new album, Des Diables et des Dieux with the original line-up.

Discography
 Des Diables et des Dieux [CD] [dsm1901] - DSM Music - March 2019
 Opus 7: Elevation [CD] [AD-HUN-87-CD] - Advoxya Records - May 2014
 Im Mortelle [CD] [dsm1301] - DSM Music, Audioglobe - January 2013
 Ultimum Omnium - The Black Edition [CD] [dsm1202] - DSM Music, Audioglobe - May 2012
 Ultimum Omnium [CD] [dsm1201] - DSM Music, Audioglobe - April 2012
 There is No Cure [CD] [nr049] - Nilaihah Records - April 2011
 DSM [CD] [nr046] - Nilaihah Records - August 2010
 Trance :N: Dance [CD] - Aural Music / DreamCell11, Soolfood - September 2009
 Sexual Music for Sexual Mass [Digital] - Aural Music / DreamCell11 - 2009  
 L'Empire des Sens [CD] - Last Episode / Silverdust / Metal Blade / Irond, M10 - 2001

Members

1998 - 2002 

 V. Orias A. (VoA VoXyD): guitars, bass
 Vicomte Vampyr Arkames: vocals
 Asmody: keyboards
 N. Aboriim: drums

2007 - 2009 

 VoA VoXyD: guitars, keyboards
 Vicomte Vampyr Arkames: vocals
 M. Hide: bass
 Asphodel: vocals
 VNA: drums

2010 - 2015 

 VoA VoXyD: guitars, keyboards, programming
 Vicomte Vampyr Arkames: vocals
 Asphodel: vocals on DSM

2019 

 V. Orias A. (VoA VoXyD): guitars, bass
 Vicomte Vampyr Arkames: vocals
 Asmody: keyboards
 N. Aboriim: drums

Collaborations
 Morfeus (Limbonic Art, Mayhem, Viper Solfa): on "L'Empire des Sens" and "Opus 7 Elevation"
 Aldrahn ( Dodheimsgard, Zyklon-B, Thorns): on "Ultimum Omnium"
 Marco B. (Obsidian Gate): on "L'Empire des Sens"
 Robynne Leah: on "L'Empire des Sens"
 Vratyas Vakyas (Falkenbach): on "L'Empire des Sens"
 Lindsay Schoolcraft (Cradle of Filth): on "Opus 7 Elevation"
 Melissa Ferlaak (Aesma Daeva, Visions of Atlantis): on "Opus 7 Elevation"
 Sanna Salou (Orakle): on "Opus 7 Elevation"
 Kari Berg (Ashbury Heights): on "There is no Cure"
 Zombie Girl: on "There is no Cure"

References

External links

Interviews
 Reflections of Darkness (Online interview, Germany)
 Darkwave (Online interview, Romania)
 Electrowelt (Online interview, Germany)
 Blackvector (Online interview, Sweden)
 Uselinks (Online interview, Germany)
 Electric Deth Trip Media (Online interview, USA)
 FK Digital Records (Online interview, Austria)
 Brutal Resonance (Online interview, Sweden)
 Dark Essence Radio  (Online interview, Australia)
 AOID (Online interview, Austria)

French gothic metal musical groups
Musical groups established in 1998
Musical groups disestablished in 2015